Kristína Panáková (born 4 December 2001) is a Slovak footballer who plays as a forward for Women's First League club Spartak Myjava and the Slovakia women's national team.

Club career
Panáková has played for Spartak Myjava in Slovakia.

International career
Panáková made her senior debut for Slovakia on 14 June 2019 as a 78th-minute substitution in a 1–0 friendly home win over Poland.

References

2001 births
Living people
Slovak women's footballers
Women's association football forwards
Spartak Myjava players
Slovakia women's international footballers